is a Japanese professional footballer who plays as a centre back for  club Avispa Fukuoka.

Career statistics

Club
.

References

External links
Profile at Avispa Fukuoka

1999 births
Living people
Association football people from Hyōgo Prefecture
Konan University alumni
Japanese footballers
Association football defenders
Avispa Fukuoka players